Mena is a hamlet in the parish of Lanivet in mid Cornwall, England.
 It should not be confused with Menna in the parish of Ladock.

References

Hamlets in Cornwall